"The Men in My Little Girl's Life" is a song written by Mary Candy, Eddie Dean, and Gloria Shayne and performed by Mike Douglas. The song was arranged by Jerry Fielding and produced by Manny Kellem.  It was featured on Douglas' 1966 album The Men in My Little Girl's Life.

Chart performance
It reached #3 on the adult contemporary chart and #6 on the U.S. pop chart in 1966.

Other charting versions
Archie Campbell released a version of the song as a single in 1966 which reached #16 on the U.S. country chart.
Tex Ritter released a version of the song as a single in 1966 which reached #50 on the U.S. country chart.

Other versions
Telly Savalas released a version of the song on his 1976 album Who Loves Ya Baby.

References

1965 songs
1965 singles
1966 singles
Songs written by Gloria Shayne Baker
Tex Ritter songs
Epic Records singles
Capitol Records singles